Kuchek (meaning "small") may refer to:
 Kuchek, West Azerbaijan
 Kuchek-e Olya, Kurdistan Province
 Kuchek-e Sofla, Kurdistan Province
 Kuchek Olum

See also